Robert Muldrow (June 11, 1864 – July 28, 1950) was an American geologist.

Biography
Born on June 11, 1864 in Oktibbeha County, Mississippi, in 1887 Muldrow joined the US Geological Survey. In 1888 he was the youngest co-founder of the National Geographic Society. In 1898 he did the first scientific measurements of Denali (Mount McKinley), and had Muldrow Glacier named after him. He retired in 1927, and died in Arlington, Virginia on July 28, 1950. Robert and his wife Elizabeth were laid to rest in Arlington National Cemetery.

References

1863 births
1950 deaths
National Geographic Society founders
American geologists
People from Oktibbeha County, Mississippi